Speculation is the process of thinking about possibilities, or a particular conclusion arrived at from such thought.

Speculation may also refer to:

Speculation, the purchase of an asset with the hope that it will become more valuable in the future
Speculative fiction, an umbrella term for imaginative fiction genres, especially science fiction
Speculative reason, also called theoretical reason or pure reason
Continental philosophy, an academic term to categorize several schools of speculative thought
Speculation (card game), a gambling game popular around the turn of the nineteenth century

See also

Speculations (book), a 1982 collection of short science fiction stories
Speculations (magazine), a defunct writers resource magazine for the speculative fiction subgenre
Speculative (disambiguation)
Speculator (disambiguation)